Whirlwind Inlet is an ice-filled inlet that recedes inland for 7 nautical miles (13 km) and is 12 nautical miles (22 km) wide at its entrance between Cape Northrop and Tent Nunatak, along the east coast of Graham Land. Sir Hubert Wilkins discovered the inlet on his flight of December 20, 1928. Wilkins reported four large glaciers flowing into the inlet, which he named Whirlwind Glaciers because their relative position was suggestive of the radial cylinders of his Wright Whirlwind engine. The inlet was photographed from the air by the United States Antarctic Service (USAS) in 1940 and charted by the Falkland Islands Dependencies Survey (FIDS) in 1947.

Further reading 

 Defense Mapping Agency Hydrographic/Topographic Center, Sailing Directions (planning Guide) and (enroute) for Antarctica, P 274
 Ian Renfrew, Polar storms and polar jets: Mesoscale weather systems in the Arctic & Antarctic
 Andy Elvidge, Ian Renfrew, What causes foehn warming?
 Suzanne L. Bevan, Adrian Luckman, Bryn Hubbard, Bernd Kulessa, David Ashmore, Peter Kuipers Munneke, Martin O’Leary, Adam Booth, Heidi Sevestre, and Daniel McGrath, Centuries of intense surface melt on Larsen C Ice Shelf, The Cryosphere, 11, 2743–2753, 2017 https://doi.org/10.5194/tc-11-2743-2017

External links 

 Whirlwind Inlet on USGS website
 Whirlwind Inlet on SCAR website

References 

Inlets of Graham Land
Bowman Coast
Foyn Coast